Dimensional People is eleventh studio album by German electronica group Mouse on Mars. The 2018 album aims to be one orchestra piece letting musicians express freely instrumentally or vocally and features more than 50 collaborators including Justin Vernon of Bon Iver, The National's Aaron and Bryce Dessner, Spank Rock and Zach Condon of Beirut. 

Most of the album was recorded in 2017 in the studio April Base in Wisconsin.

Release
Mouse on Mars debuted Dimensional People at an academic conference at the Massachusetts Institute of Technology in March 2018 and released the album via Thrill Jockey on 13 April 2018 on CD and vinyl. The first single off the album, released in January, was "Dimensional People III", featuring Justin Vernon.

Reception
At Metacritic, which assigns a weighted average score out of 100 to reviews from mainstream critics, Dimensional People received an average score of 71% based on 10 reviews, indicating "generally favorable reviews".

Accolades

Live performances 
August 24th 2018 - Elbphilharmonie, Hamburg, Germany 

Feb 9th 2019 Musica nova, Helsinki, Finland with Moritz Simon Geist and Tyondai Braxton

Oct. 2019 - 43. Leipziger Jazztage, Leipzig, Germany

Track listing
All tracks written and composed by Jan St. Werner and Andi Toma, except where noted.

Personnel

Sam Amidon – violin, voices
Michelberger Bar – ambience
JT Bates – drums
Amanda Blank – voices
Helen Bledsoe – flute
Michinori Bunya – double bass
C.J. Camerieri	– trumpet
Christine Chapman – French horn
Eric D. Clarke – piano, voices
Bruce Collings – trombone
Zach Condon – engineering, voices
Phil Cooks – banjo
Aaron Dessner – guitar
Bryce Dessner – guitar, string arrangements
DJ Delish – DJ
April Base Frogs – ambience
Matti Gajek – electronics
Moritz Simon Geist – electronic accordion
Sam Greens – engineer
Trever Hagen – trumpet
Lisa Hannigan – voices
Patrick Hetherington – guitar, voices
Noah Hill – voices
Azar Kazimir – art direction

Benjamin Kobler – piano
Max Köhrich – mastering
Ben Lanz – trombone
Ben Lester – pedal steel
Mike Lewis – saxophone
Dirk Leyers – engineer
Matthew McCaughan – percussion
Michael Rauter	– cello
Rob Moose – violin
Zach Morgan – engineer
Nathan Plante – trumpet
Melvyn Poore – tuba
Axel Porath – viola
Dirk Rothbrust – percussion
Anatole Serret – voices
Spank Rock – vocals
Louie Swain – piano, voices
Swamp Dogg – voices
Andi Toma – bass, drums, electronics, guitar, piano, processing
Justin Vernon – guitar, voices
Hannah Weirich – violin
Jan St. Werner – electronics, harmonica, piano, processing, voices
Dirk Wietheger – continuo violoncello

References

2018 albums
Mouse on Mars albums
Thrill Jockey albums